A Rake's Progress is a series of eight paintings by British artist William Hogarth.

Rake's Progress may also refer to:

The Rake's Progress, an opera by Igor Stravinsky based on the paintings
The Rake's Progress (ballet), a ballet based on the paintings
The Rake's Progress (film), a 1945 British film directed by Sidney Gilliat
"The Rakes Progress", a song by Marillion from Holidays in Eden

See also
Rake (disambiguation)
Progress (disambiguation)